Wilfried Bock is a retired East German biathlete who won a gold medal at the first world championship. He was awarded the Saxony biathlete of the century. Later he opened a skiing school. He began his career at the SG Dynamo Zinnwald / Sportvereinigung (SV) Dynamo.

References

Year of birth missing (living people)
Living people
German male biathletes
Biathlon World Championships medalists